Delta Tour Zeeland was a road bicycle stage race held annually in June in Zeeland, Netherlands. In 2008, the race was organized as a 2.1 event on the UCI Europe Tour as the organizers of the one-day race Delta Profronde and of the OZ Wielerweekend operated a fusion to create the stage race. The first winner of the race was the Australian Christopher Sutton and the last was German Marcel Kittel.

In 2012, it was renamed Ronde van Zeeland Seaports, coming back to its one-day race roots with a 1.1 ranking on the UCI Europe Tour.

Winners

References

External links
  Official website

Cycle races in the Netherlands
UCI Europe Tour races
Cycling in Zeeland
Recurring sporting events established in 2008
2008 establishments in the Netherlands
2011 disestablishments in the Netherlands
Defunct cycling races in the Netherlands